Durham—Northumberland is a former federal electoral district represented in the House of Commons of Canada from 1979 to 1988. It was located in the province of Ontario. This riding was created in 1976 from parts of Northumberland—Durham and Ontario ridings.

It consisted of:
 in the Regional Municipality of Durham: the Township of Scugog and the Town of Newcastle;
 in the County of Northumberland: the Township of Hope, the Town of Port Hope, the Town of Cobourg, and the part of the Township of Hamilton lying west of the Town of Cobourg and south of Highway 401;
 in the County of Peterborough: the Township of Cavan; and
 in the County of Victoria: the Township of Manvers.

The electoral district was abolished in 1987 when it was redistributed between Durham and Victoria—Haliburton ridings.

Members of Parliament

This riding has elected the following Members of Parliament:

Election results

|}

|}

|}

See also 

 List of Canadian federal electoral districts
 Past Canadian electoral districts

External links 
Riding history from the Library of Parliament

Former federal electoral districts of Ontario